The 2005 European Karate Championships, the 40th edition, were held  in San Cristóbal de La Laguna, Spain from 13 to 15 May 2005.

Medallists

Men's competition

Individual

Team

Women's competition

Individual

Team

Medal table

References

External links
 Karate Records – European Championship 2005

2005
International karate competitions hosted by Spain
European Karate Championships
European championships in 2005
Sport in Tenerife
Karate competitions in Spain
May 2005 sports events in Europe